The 1902 Austria v Hungary football match was a football match held on 12 October 1902 between Austria and Hungary. The match was played at the ground of Wiener AC, a stone's throw from the modern Ernst-Happel-Stadion, and it ended in a 5–0 win for the hosts.

Historical context
This match marked the official debut of the Austrian and Hungarian national football teams and was also the first official international football game in continental Europe. Furthermore, it was the second official international match played outside the British Isles after a game between Argentina and Uruguay in July 1902.

Summary
Josef Taurer was the author of the very first goal in non-British international football when he put the Austrians ahead in the 5th minute. Five minutes later Johann "Jan" Studnicka doubled the lead and Gustav Huber added a third before the break. The second half was also dominated by Austria, which scored two more goals to seal a 5–0 win, both netted by Studnicka who thus completed his hat-trick.

The match

Post-match 
A few months later, Hungary faced Bohemia on 5 April 1903, which was the second official international football game in continental Europe..

See also 
Austria–Hungary football rivalry
List of first association football internationals per country
Austria national football team
Hungary national football team
History of the Hungary national football team

References

1902–03 in Austrian football
1902 in Hungarian football
Austria national football team matches
Hungary national football team matches
October 1902 sports events